Erich Amplatz (born 6 February 1960) is an Austrian former table tennis player. He competed in the men's doubles event at the 1992 Summer Olympics.

References

External links
 

1960 births
Living people
Austrian male table tennis players
Olympic table tennis players of Austria
Table tennis players at the 1992 Summer Olympics
People from Judenburg
Sportspeople from Styria
20th-century Austrian people